"Real World" is a song co-written and performed by American band Queensrÿche and orchestral composer Michael Kamen that was contributed to the action film Last Action Hero in 1993 and was recorded during the sessions for the band's 1994 album Promised Land and would surface on the 2003 remastered CD of Promised Land. The band also released the song as part of their 2007 compilation album Sign of the Times.

Chart performance

Personnel
Geoff Tate - vocals
Michael Wilton - lead guitar
Chris DeGarmo - rhythm guitar
Eddie Jackson - bass
Scott Rockenfield - drums

Additional personnel
Michael Kamen-orchestra arranger, conductor

References

Queensrÿche songs
1993 singles
Songs written by Michael Kamen
1993 songs
Columbia Records singles